Wei-Chieh Huang (born September 26, 1993) is a Taiwanese professional baseball pitcher in the Pittsburgh Pirates organization. He has played in Major League Baseball (MLB) for the Texas Rangers.

Career
Huang graduated from Kao-Yuan Tech High School in Kaohsiung and attended the National Taiwan University of Physical Education and Sport.

Arizona Diamondbacks
In 2014, he signed with the Arizona Diamondbacks as an international free agent. In 2015, Huang made his professional debut with the Kane County Cougars and spent the whole season there, posting a 7–3 record and 2.00 ERA in 15 games (12 starts). Huang was chosen to represent the Diamondbacks at the 2015 All-Star Futures Game. He spent 2016 with both the Visalia Rawhide, where he pitched to a 1–1 record and 6.49 ERA in six games started, and the Hillsboro Hops where he posted a 2–2 record and 5.34 ERA in nine games. In 2017, he spent time with both the Kane County Cougars and Visalia, pitching to a combined 2–1 record and 1.81 ERA in 64.2 total innings between both teams. Huang split the majority of his 2018 season between the Rawhide and the Jackson Generals.

Texas Rangers
The Diamondbacks traded Huang and Joshua Javier to the Texas Rangers for Jake Diekman on July 31, 2018. Huang was assigned to the Frisco RoughRiders after the trade. In a combined 38 games (2 starts) between Visalia, Jackson, and Frisco, Huang posted a 7–3 record with a 3.33 ERA and 103 strikeouts in 78 innings. The Rangers added him to their 40-man roster after the 2018 season.

In 2019, Huang split the minor league season between Frisco, the AZL Rangers, and the Nashville Sounds, going a combined 2–2 with a 4.74 ERA over  innings. On April 23, he was called up to the major league roster for the first time. He made his major league debut that night, pitching  innings in relief. Huang appeared in four games for Texas in 2019, going 0–0 with a 3.18 ERA in  innings. On December 2, 2019, Huang was non-tendered by Texas and became a free agent. He re-signed with Texas on a minor league contract on December 5.

On August 8, 2020, Huang was released by the Rangers organization.

San Francisco Giants
On February 2, 2022, Huang signed a minor league contract with the San Francisco Giants. In 2022, he pitched 7.1 scoreless innings for Giants Orange, and pitching for Sacramento he was 3-2 with a 4.40 ERA in 71.2 innings in which he struck out 89 batters.

Pittsburgh Pirates
On December 7, 2022, Huang was claimed by the Pittsburgh Pirates in the minor league phase of the Rule 5 draft.

See also
 List of Major League Baseball players from Taiwan
 Rule 5 draft results

References

External links

1993 births
Living people
People from Taitung County
Taiwanese expatriate baseball players in the United States
Major League Baseball players from Taiwan
Major League Baseball pitchers
Texas Rangers players
Arizona League Diamondbacks players
Hillsboro Hops players
Kane County Cougars players
Visalia Rawhide players
Jackson Generals (Southern League) players
Arizona League Rangers players
Frisco RoughRiders players
Nashville Sounds players
Estrellas Orientales players
Sacramento River Cats players